The Akademio Literatura de Esperanto (ALE) is an independent and neutral institution which aims to encourage the creative and artistic literary production in the Esperanto language. Officially founded on July 24, 2008, It has been inspired by the efforts made by Esperantlingva Verkista Asocio. The academy should not be confused with the Akademio de Esperanto, whose goal is to steward the evolution of the language.

References

Esperanto organizations
Academies
Esperanto literature
Organizations established in 2002
Language advocacy organizations